777 – Sect(s) is the eighth full-length album by French Black Metal band Blut Aus Nord. The album was released on April 18, 2011 through Debemur Morti Productions. It is the first album in the '777' trilogy, with the others being called 777 – The Desanctification and 777 – Cosmosophy. The album was recorded, mixed, and mastered at Earthsound Studio, with artwork provided by Daniel Valencia.

Critical reception
The album was received well by critics. Pitchfork's Brandon Stosuy picked '777 – Sect(s)' and '777 - The Desanctification' as the two best metal albums of 2011, writing that "Beyond the experimentation, both of these records also really move-- you could almost dance to the latter." The albums were also featured on the site's honourable mentions for overall album of the year by Philip Sherburne.

Invisible Oranges' Cosmo Lee praised the album in his review of it, writing that "Everything sounds bigger and more daring. The trademark atonality is present, but it forks into menacing jangles and triumphant melodies. These turns are unpredictable, and over time the effect is simultaneously hellish and heavenly."

PopMatters named it the 12th best metal album of 2011, writing that "It’s an ambitious tale, reinforced by some of the band’s most mesmerizing material yet. [...] Confrontational and punishing, 777:Sect(s) is a malevolently creative indulgence and a wonderfully disturbing prophecy."

Track listing

References

2011 albums
Blut Aus Nord albums